Mandy Payne (born 1964) is a member of the Contemporary British Painting group and is an artist with a primary interest in portraying the regeneration of inner city environments and the transitory nature of urban communities. Her themes include the contrasts between twentieth century inner-city social housing and modern gentrification.

Work 
Works from her series studying the housing estate of Park Hill, Sheffield (UK) - showing its dilapidated state and Brutalist architecture before renovation - feature in private and public collections including that of the University of Salford, the Ruskin Collection (Sheffield Museums), The Priseman Seabrook Collection, and the Newlight Art Prize collection. She has won multiple awards and has received commissions including selection in 2017 for StudioBook - the artist professional development programme with Mark Devereaux Projects (MDP), Manchester - and was awarded Commission to Collect by MDP and the University of Salford Art Collection, to create a new painting considering the impacts of the Grenfell Tower incident upon Salford's housing developments. Recognition for her work includes selection for the John Moores Painting Prize (2014, 2016 & 2020), the Royal Academy Summer Exhibition (each year from 2014 to 2019), the Threadneedle Prize (2013) and the Lynn Painter-Stainers Prize (2019).

In 2017 she was noted as an artist to watch in the Observer/Guardian Rising Stars list.

As a painter and print-maker she works on a range of surfaces including paper, concrete, etched aluminium and discarded marble work surfaces or floorboards salvaged from the derelict or decommissioned sites she is depicting. She creates stone Lithographs of her drawings and her painting materials include various combinations of aerosol paint, roofing sealant, acrylic and lithographic crayon directly onto board or her purpose made concrete slabs.

Life 
Prior to 2012 she had a 25 year career as a Dentist in the NHS Community and Hospital Dental Services. In 2013 she gained a BA (Hons) Fine Art (First Class) degree at the University of Nottingham and in 2015 she was awarded a 2 year Fellowship to study stone lithography at Leicester Print Workshop under the tutelage of Serena Smith.

Exhibitions 
Payne has held solo exhibitions of her work and has been included in group exhibitions at several galleries and exhibition venues both nationally and internationally, including the Herrick Gallery (Piccadilly, London), Huddersfield Art Gallery, Bowes Museum (Barnard Castle), Jiangsu Art Gallery (Nanjing, China), Menier Gallery (Southwark Street, London), Walker Art Gallery (Liverpool), Bankside Gallery (Thames Riverside, London), National Museum of Poland (National Museum, Gdańsk, Poland) and Panter and Hall (Pall Mall, London).

Collections 
 University of Salford Art Collection. Salford, UK 
Elizabeth Greenshield Foundation Collection. Montreal, Canada
 Ruskin Collection, Millennium Gallery. Sheffield Museums, UK
 The Priseman Seabrook Collection. Essex, UK
 New Light Art Collection. UK
 Yale Center for British Art. Connecticut, USA
 University of Nottingham Ningbo China.
 Devonshire Collection. Chatsworth House, Derbyshire, UK
 University of Sheffield. Sheffield, UK

References

External links 
 
 Leicester Print Workshop - Mandy Payne
 University of Salford - Mandy Payne award 
 BBC Arts - Review by Norman Ackroyd featuring 'Abandoned Utopia' by Mandy Payne

Living people
1964 births
Date of birth missing (living people)
People from Pontypool
21st-century British painters
Alumni of the University of Nottingham
British dentists
British women painters
21st-century British women artists